Two ships of the United States Navy have been named USS Triana, probably for Rodrigo de Triana, the lookout aboard , who first sighted land on 12 October 1492 during Christopher Columbus's first voyage to the New World, although no documentary evidence has been found linking either ship to Triana.

 , a tug launched in 1865 and wrecked in 1891
 , an unclassified miscellaneous vessel commissioned in 1945 and decommissioned in 1946

United States Navy ship names